Venetian Village is an upscale, waterside open-air shopping district in Naples, Florida, built on the edge of Venetian Bay. The mall contains a large number of stores and restaurants. This shopping district is located along Gulf Shore Boulevard North, close to the Gulf of Mexico.

References 

Shopping malls in Florida
Buildings and structures in Naples, Florida
Tourist attractions in Collier County, Florida